Harbert Hills Academy is an independent, self-supporting, co-educational, private day and boarding school. It is owned and operated by Rural Life Foundation, chartered as a non-profit 501(c)3 corporation in August 1951. The 500-acre (202 ha) campus is located Savannah, Tennessee. Harbert Hills Academy has connections to the Seventh-day Adventist Church, but is not part of the denominational Seventh-day Adventist education system.

History
A secondary educational institution, Harbert Hills Academy was founded by William E. Patterson,  a retired FBI Agent who attended Fletcher Academy, then later decided he would start a similar school. Agent Patterson spoke with local Judge Harbert, who he had worked with while prosecuting moonshine cases. Judge Harbert donated over 500 acres to build the Harbert Hills Academy campus. The late President Emeritus L.L. Dickman and other Dickman family members have taken an enhanced interest in the Academy over the years and they have served in leadership capacities for decades.

Notable landmarks
A notable campus house nearby was owned by the late, FBI Agent Patterson. Agent Patterson, the founder of the Academy, because of his work successfully busting and prosecuting illegal moonshine operations had the house specially designed. The house is unique in that all the light switches are located outside the doors of the rooms. This was done to help protect the former FBI agent in his retired years to avoid a potential attack from former defendants. This small cottage is now owned by the wife of the late President Emeritus L.L. Dickman.

Another notable landmark near the school is the, "Lonesome Pine" a giant Pine tree, on Lonesome Pine Road which historically was used to help direct potential customers to the local moonshine in the woods nearby.

Curriculum
Harbert Hills Academy’s curriculum consists primarily of the standard courses taught at college preparatory schools across the world. All students are required to take classes in the core areas of English, Basic Sciences, Mathematics, a Foreign Language, and Social Sciences. It is accredited by the E. A. Sutherland Education Association, which was developed by The Layman Foundation to assist independently operated and self-supporting schools that exist outside the Seventh-day Adventist denominational education system.

Spiritual aspects
Students take religion classes each year that they are enrolled. These classes cover topics in biblical history and Christian and denominational doctrines. Instructors in other disciplines may also begin each class period with prayer or a short devotional thought, many which encourage student input. Weekly, the entire student body gathers together in the auditorium for an hour-long chapel service. Outside the classrooms there is year-round spiritually oriented programming that relies on student involvement. Harbert Hills Academy leans somewhat more conservative than a majority of other Adventist Institutions.

See also

 List of Seventh-day Adventist secondary schools
 Seventh-day Adventist education

References

External links
 

Private high schools in Tennessee
Boarding schools in Tennessee
Adventist secondary schools in the United States
Schools in Hardin County, Tennessee